The song "When Spirits Are Calling My Name" (original Swedish title "När vindarna viskar mitt namn", literally translated as "When the Winds Whisper My Name") was performed by Roger Pontare in the 2000 Eurovision Song Contest 2000, in representation of .

Celebration of indigenous culture

The song extols the traditions of indigenous peoples and their efforts to protect their territories and cultures. For his solo appearance in 2000, Pontare wore a Sami costume associated with the indigenous population of Lapland in  northern Sweden (and also the northern regions of Norway, Finland, and Russia). On his performance at the Eurovision Song Contest, Pontare was accompanied by a Cree Native American dancer, a Thule Inuit and a Norwegian Sami.

Eurovision Song Contest 2000
Melodifestivalen 2000 was the 40th edition of the Swedish national selection for the Eurovision Song Contest, which was being held in the Ericsson Globe Arena in Stockholm after Charlotte Nilsson's victory the year before with "Take Me to Your Heaven". Roger Pontare won the right to represent his country after his song "När vindarna viskar mitt namn" was chosen by the Swedish public after earning 227 points in the final voting results at the 40th edition of Melodifestivalen. The song was then performed in English as "When Spirits Are Calling My Name" at the Eurovision Song Contest 2000.

The song performed 18th, after  and before , and finished in 7th place among 24 other competitors with a total of 88 points.

At the song's climax, flames erupted from two vents at the front of the stage.

Popularity
"När vindarna viskar mitt namn" was also released as a single in 2000, which sold Swedish platina (30 000 copies). The single peaked at #3 at the Swedish singles chart. On 22 April 2000 the song directly entered Svensktoppen, where it stayed for two rounds. On 6 May 2000 the song was down at the third place after peaking for two weeks. On 5 August 2000 the song was 9th, being at the list for 16th at last time.

Covers by other bands
Swedish bands Ultima Thule and HammerFall later covered "När vindarna viskar mitt namn".

Track listing
När vindarna viskar mitt namn - 2:58
När vindarna viskar mitt namn (singback) - 2:58

Eurovision songs of 2000
Eurovision songs of Sweden
Melodifestivalen songs of 2000
Roger Pontare songs
2000 songs
Sámi culture